Lepidochitonidae is a family of chitons belonging to the order Chitonida.

Genera:
 Cyanoplax Pilsbry, 1892
 Juvenichiton Sirenko, 1975
 Lepidochitona Gray, 1821
 Micichiton Sirenko, 1975
 Nanichiton Sirenko, 1975
 Nuttallina Dall, 1871
 Particulazona Kaas, 1993

References

Chitons
Chiton families